Joseph Iadone (September 5, 1914 – March 23, 2004) was an American lutenist who was a member of various bands, including New York Pro Musica, Renaissance Quartet, and Iadone Consort.

Early life
Joseph Iadone attended Yale University, while studying with composer Paul Hindemith, Hindemith suggested that Iadone take the lute.

Career
In the late 1950s, Iadone helped James Tyler study the lute.

Death
On March 23, 2004, Iadone died at a retirement home in New Haven, Connecticut.

References

1914 births
2004 deaths
American lutenists
Yale School of Music alumni